The Powhatan or Powhatan Apartments is a 22-story luxury apartment building overlooking Lake Michigan and adjacent to Burnham Park in the Kenwood neighborhood of Chicago, Illinois. The building was designed by architects Robert De Golyer and Charles L. Morgan.  Much of the Art Deco detailing is attributed to Morgan who was associated with Frank Lloyd Wright. The exterior of the luxury-apartment highrise reflects Eliel Saarinen's second place design for the Tribune Tower competition of 1922. The building's terra-cotta ornamental panels feature conventionalized scenes based upon Native American culture.

This housing cooperative is a residential high-rise on Chicago's South Side.  The building also hosts the only 24-hour elevator operators in Chicago. Since it and many of the neighboring high-rise apartment buildings are named for Native American tribes (such as the Algonquin, The Chippewa and the Narragansett), the area has been given the tongue-in-cheek name "Indian Village". It was designated a Chicago Landmark on January 12, 1993.

Notes

Apartment buildings in Chicago
Residential skyscrapers in Chicago
South Side, Chicago
Housing cooperatives in the United States
Residential buildings completed in 1929
Art Deco architecture in Illinois
1929 establishments in Illinois
Chicago school architecture in Illinois
Chicago Landmarks